This is a list of now defunct airlines from Gambia.

See also

 List of airlines of Gambia
 List of airports in the Gambia

References

Gambia
Airlines